Tooker Mountain is a summit located in Central New York Region of New York located in the Town of Webb in Herkimer County, southeast of Minnehaha.

References

Mountains of Herkimer County, New York
Mountains of New York (state)